Winston Rogers III, professionally known by his stage name Tela, is an American rapper from Memphis, Tennessee. He was associated with Eightball & MJG early in his career.

Discography

Studio albums

Independent albums
Made in the USA (2007)
Gators & Suits (2010)

Singles

As lead artist

As featured artist

References

External links
 Tela at Discogs

Living people
Gangsta rappers
Rap-A-Lot Records artists
Suave House Records artists
African-American male rappers
Rappers from Memphis, Tennessee
21st-century American rappers
21st-century American male musicians
21st-century African-American musicians
1970 births